Dhab is a village in the Domchanch CD block in the Koderma subdivision of  the Koderma district in the Indian state of Jharkhand.

Geography

Location                              
Dhab is located at

Overview
Koderma district is plateau territory and around 60% of the total area is covered with forests. The first dam of the Damodar Valley Corporation, at Tilaiya, was built across the Barakar River and inaugurated in 1953. Koderma Junction railway station has emerged as an important railway centre in the region. It is a predominantly rural district with only 19.72% urban population.

Note: The map alongside presents some of the notable locations in the district. All places marked in the map are linked in the larger full screen map.

Demographics
According to the 2011 Census of India, Dhab had a total population of 2,291, of which 1,165 (51%) were males and 1,126 (49%) were females. Population in the age range 0–6 years was 509. The total number of literate persons in Dhab  was 937 (52.58% of the population over 6 years).

Civic administration

Police station
Dhab police station serves Domchanch CD block.

References

Villages in Koderma district